Carectocultus is a genus of moths of the family Crambidae.

Species
Carectocultus bivitta Möschler, 1882
Carectocultus dominicki A. Blanchard, 1975
Carectocultus perstrialis (Hübner, 1831)

Former species
Carectocultus repugnatalis (Walker, 1863)

References

Schoenobiinae
Crambidae genera